The Faculty of Organisational Sciences of the University in Belgrade is one of the first-tier educational institutions of the University of Belgrade, Serbia.

History
The Faculty of Organizational Sciences was registered on 6 May 1971 and inaugural school year was 1971/72. In January 2018, the Government of Serbia and Faculty signed a contract for the construction of new facility, which would have 7,619 square meters and once completed it would create conditions for enrollment of additional 750 students annually.

Departments
 Department of Information Systems and Technologies
 Department of E-business
 Department of Management and Organization
 Department of Production and Operations Management
 Department of Quality Management
 Department of Mathematics, Statistics and Operations Research
 Department of Social Sciences

References

External links
 

University of Belgrade schools
Educational institutions established in 1971
University of Belgrade Faculty of Organizational Sciences
University of Belgrade
Education in Belgrade